Vanderson de Oliveira Campos (born 21 June 2001), simply known as Vanderson, is a Brazilian professional footballer who plays as a right-back for Ligue 1 club Monaco.

Career
On 18 December 2020, Vanderson signed a 4-year contract with Grêmio. He made his professional debut with the club in a 2–1 Campeonato Brasileiro Série A win over Atlético Goianiense on 28 December 2020.

On 1 January 2022, Vanderson signed for Ligue 1 club Monaco on a contract until June 2027. The transfer fee paid to Grêmio was reportedly of €11 million.

Career statistics

Honours
 Grêmio
Campeonato Gaúcho: 2021
Recopa Gaúcha: 2021

References

External links
 Profile at the AS Monaco FC website
 
 

2001 births
Living people
People from Rondonópolis
Brazilian footballers
Association football fullbacks
Grêmio Foot-Ball Porto Alegrense players
AS Monaco FC players
Campeonato Brasileiro Série A players
Ligue 1 players
Brazilian expatriate footballers
Expatriate footballers in Monaco
Brazilian expatriate sportspeople in Monaco
Sportspeople from Mato Grosso